Lyelliceratidae is a family of ammonites belonging to the superfamily Acanthoceratoidea.

These cephalopods were fast-moving nektonic carnivores. They lived in the Cretaceous period (109.0 to 94.3 Ma).

Genera
Lyelliceras Spath, 1921
Pseudobrancoceras Kennedy, 2004
Tegoceras Hyatt, 1903
Budaiceras Böse, 1928
Cenisella Delamette and Latil, 1989
Neophlycticeras Spath, 1922
Ojinagiceras Cobban and Kennedy, 1989
Paracalycoceras
Stoliczkaia Neumayr, 1875
Zuluscaphites Van Hoepen, 1955

References

Ammonitida families
Acanthoceratoidea
Cretaceous ammonites
Albian first appearances
Cenomanian extinctions